Industry is a television drama series created by Mickey Down and Konrad Kay. The show follows a group of young graduates competing for permanent positions at Pierpoint & Co, a prestigious investment bank in London.

It premiered on 9 November 2020 on HBO in the United States, and on 10 November 2020 on BBC Two in the United Kingdom.  In December 2020, it was renewed for a second season which premiered on 1 August 2022. In October 2022, the series was renewed for a third season.

Cast
Industry features a large cast, although only Yasmin (Marisa Abela), Harper (Myha'la Herrold), Robert (Harry Lawtey) and Eric (Ken Leung) have appeared in every episode. Gus (David Jonsson), Kenny (Conor MacNeill) and Daria (Freya Mavor) appear in every episode of the first season, while Danny (Alex Alomar Akpobome) appears in every episode of the second season. All other cast members appear infrequently but are credited with the main cast when they appear.

Main

Marisa Abela as Yasmin Kara-Hanani, an ambitious graduate from a wealthy background, fluent in English, Spanish, French, Italian and Arabic, assigned to the Foreign Exchange Sales (FX) desk at Pierpoint
Priyanga Burford as Sara Dhadwal (season 1), the President of Pierpoint London
Mark Dexter as Hilary Wyndham, managing director of FX at Pierpoint
Myha'la Herrold as Harper Stern, an underrated, intelligent, and talented young woman from Binghamton, New York, assigned to the Cross Product Sales (CPS) desk at Pierpoint
David Jonsson as Augustus "Gus" Sackey, a black, gay graduate of literae humaniores at Eton and Oxford, initially assigned to the Investment Banking Division (IBD) desk at Pierpoint, then the CPS desk 
Harry Lawtey as Robert Spearing, a graduate of Oxford from a working-class Welsh background, assigned to the CPS desk at Pierpoint
Ben Lloyd-Hughes as Greg Grayson (season 1), a VP at the CPS desk
Conor MacNeill as Kenny Kilbane, a VP at the FX desk at Pierpoint, Yasmin's direct line manager
Freya Mavor as Daria Greenock (season 1; guest season 2), a VP at the CPS desk at Pierpoint, Harper's manager
Derek Riddell as Clement Cowan (season 1), CPS VP and Robert's manager, who struggles with heroin addiction
Nabhaan Rizwan as Hari Dhar (pilot), a graduate of a state school from a Hindi-speaking immigrant family, assigned to the IBD desk at Pierpoint
Will Tudor as Theo Tuck (season 1), a closeted Eton graduate and second year research analyst for Pierpoint
Ken Leung as Eric Tao, the CPS managing director who takes Harper under his wing
Sarah Parish as Nicole Craig, a Pierpoint client who is sexually inappropriate with Harper (season 1) and Robert (season 2). 
Andrew Buchan as Felim Bichan, a fund manager and Pierpoint's biggest client
Amir El-Masry as Usman Abboud (season 1), assistant to Kaspar Zenden, Clement's main client
Alex Alomar Akpobome as Danny Van Deventer (season 2), the Executive Director from Pierpoint New York who becomes involved with Harper
Nicholas Bishop as Maxim Alonso (season 2; recurring season 1), Yasmin's family friend and one of Pierpoint's potential clients
Katrine De Candole as Celeste Pacquet (season 2), one of Pierpoint's Private Wealth Managers who becomes involved with Yasmin
Sagar Radia as Rishi Ramdani (season 2; recurring season 1), an associate and market maker on the CPS desk
Indy Lewis as Venetia Berens (season 2; guest season 1), Yasmin's newest recruit on the Foreign Exchange Sales Desk
Trevor White as Bill Adler (season 2; guest season 1), the global head of FICC at Pierpoint
Caoilfhionn Dunne as Jackie Walsh (season 2; recurring season 1), a VP on the FX desk
 Jay Duplass as Jesse Bloom (season 2), Harper's primary client, a hedge fund manager who capitalized greatly off the pandemic
Adam Levy as Charles Hanani (season 2), Yasmin's father
 Sonny Poon Tip as Leo Bloom (season 2), Jesse's son who becomes involved with Gus
Faith Alabi as Aurore Adekunle (season 2), a Tory MP and member of the Health and Social Care Select Committee
Elena Saurel as Anna Gearing (season 2), the head of FutureDawn Partners

Recurring
 Jonathan Barnwell as Seb Oldroyd (season 1), Yasmin's underachieving, drug-addled boyfriend
 Joshua James as Justin Klineman, Head of Human Resources at Pierpoint
 Helene Maksoud as Azar Kara (season 1), Yasmin's mother
 Alexandra Moen as Candice Allbright, Eric's wife
 Brittany Ashworth as Diana (season 2), Rishi's fiancée
 Adain Bradley as John Daniel Stern (season 2), Harper's brother
 Rick Warden as Bob Spearing Senior (season 2), Robert's father
 Ruby Bentall as Lucinda Young, one of the IBD team leads as Pierpoint
 Kare Conradi as Kaspar Zenden (season 1), Clement's only client
 Branden Cook as Todd Barber (season 1), Harper's ex-boyfriend
 James Nelson-Joyce as Jamie Henson (season 2), one of Aurore's constituents
 Naana Agyei-Ampadu as Sadie Sackey (season 2), Gus' sister

Episodes

Series overview

Series 1 (2020)

Series 2 (2022)

Production
In November 2017, it was announced that HBO had put the series into development, with Mickey Down and Konrad Kay set to write the series with Jane Tranter set to serve as an executive producer, under the banner of her Bad Wolf British production company. In June 2019, it was announced that HBO had greenlit the series, with Lena Dunham set to direct the pilot. Principal photography began in June 2019, in Cardiff, Wales. In December 2019, it was announced that Myha'la Herrold, Marisa Abela, Harry Lawtey, David Johnson, Nabhaan Rizwan, Freya Mavor, Will Tudor, Conor MacNeill and Ken Leung had joined the cast of the series, with Tinge Krishnan, Ed Lilly and Mary Nighy set to serve as directors, and Sam H. Freeman and Kate Verghese to serve as writers.

In December 2020, HBO renewed the series for a second season. In July 2021, Alex Alomar Akpobome and Adam Levy were cast as new series regular while Indy Lewis who guest starred in the first season was promoted to as a series regular for the second season. The second season filming wrapped on December 8, 2021. In March 2022, Jay Duplass, Sonny Poon Tip, and Katrine De Candole were cast as new series regulars for the second season. The second season premiered on 1 August 2022 on HBO. In October 2022, HBO renewed the series for a third season.

Release
The series premiered on 9 November 2020, on HBO and HBO Max in the United States. In the United Kingdom, it premiered 10 November 2020 on BBC Two. The second season premiered on 1 August 2022.

Reception
On Rotten Tomatoes, the first season holds an approval rating of 76% with an average rating of 7.7/10, based on 38 reviews. The website's critics consensus states, "Though Industry social critiques tend toward the superficial, sharp writing and an excellent ensemble make it easy to enjoy its soapy workplace drama anyway." On Metacritic, it has a weighted average score of 69 out of 100 based on 17 reviews, indicating "generally favorable reviews".

The second season has a 100% approval rating on Rotten Tomatoes, based on 11 reviews, with an average rating of 8/10. The website's critics consensus reads, "Finessing complicated financial jargon into scathing repartee, Industrys stock is way up in this superlative sophomore season full of frustrated ambitions and tested loyalties." Vanity Fair described the series as the "missing link" between Succession and Euphoria.

Notes

References

External links

2020 American television series debuts
2020s American drama television series
2020s American LGBT-related drama television series
2020 British television series debuts
2020s British drama television series
English-language television shows
BBC television dramas
HBO original programming
Television series by BBC Studios
Television series by Home Box Office